Kupriyanov is a rural locality (a khutor) in Alexeyevsky District, Belgorod Oblast, Russia. The population was 68 as of 2010. There is 1 street.

Geography 
Kupriyanov is located 27 km southwest of Alexeyevka (the district's administrative centre) by road. Popasnoye is the nearest rural locality.

References 

Rural localities in Alexeyevsky District, Belgorod Oblast
Biryuchensky Uyezd